Georg Teigl (born 9 February 1991) is an Austrian professional footballer who plays as a right-back for Austria Wien.

Career

Red Bull Salzburg
Teigl grew up playing in the St. Pölten youth system before joining Red Bull Salzburg in June 2009. On 16 April 2011, Teigl made his debut in the Austrian Bundesliga against SK Sturm Graz. Shortly afterwards, he signed a three-year deal with the club. Teigl scored his first Austrian Bundesliga goal against Austria Wien on 2 October 2011.

RB Leipzig
On 14 January 2014, it was announced that Teigl had transferred to RB Leipzig and signed a contract till summer 2015. He scored his first goal for RB Leipzig against Fortuna Düsseldorf on 28 September 2014.

Austria Wien
Teigl moved to Austria Wien for the 2020-21 season.

On 27 February 2022, toward the end of a match with Wolfsberger AC, Teigl's head collided with another player's knee, and he collapsed with a skull fracture and concussion. He swallowed his tongue, and began choking. Wolfsberger player Luka Lochoshvili quickly waved for medical staff, and got Teigl's tongue out of his throat, saving his life. The injury ended Teigl's 2021-22 season, but he returned in August.

Career statistics

Honours

Club
Red Bull Salzburg
 Austrian Bundesliga: 2011–12
 Austrian Cup: 2011–12

References

External links
 

1991 births
Living people
Footballers from Vienna
Association football defenders
Association football midfielders
Austrian footballers
Austria youth international footballers
Austria under-21 international footballers
Austrian expatriate footballers
Expatriate footballers in Norway
Expatriate footballers in Germany
FC Red Bull Salzburg players
RB Leipzig players
FC Augsburg players
Eintracht Braunschweig players
Austrian Football Bundesliga players
2. Liga (Austria) players
Austrian Regionalliga players
Bundesliga players
2. Bundesliga players
3. Liga players
Regionalliga players